Tomice may refer to places:

Czech Republic
Tomice (Benešov District), a municipality and village
Tomice II, a village and administrative part of Olbramovice

Poland
Tomice, Wrocław County in Lower Silesian Voivodeship (south-west Poland)
Tomice, Ząbkowice Śląskie County in Lower Silesian Voivodeship (south-west Poland)
Tomice, Lesser Poland Voivodeship (south Poland)
Tomice, Masovian Voivodeship (east-central Poland)
Tomice, Pleszew County in Greater Poland Voivodeship (west-central Poland)
Tomice, Poznań County in Greater Poland Voivodeship (west-central Poland)
Tomice, Opole Voivodeship (south-west Poland)